Chompion (foaled 1965 in Kentucky) was an American Thoroughbred racehorse bred and raced by C. V. "Sonny" Whitney and trained by Ivor Balding.

In June 1971, then owner John Fieramosca announced that Chompion would be retired to stud at his Colonial Farms beginning with the 1972 season.

References

1965 racehorse births
Racehorses bred in Kentucky
Racehorses trained in the United States
Vanderbilt family
Thoroughbred family 5-j